Vincent James Foweather (26 October 1896 – 1966) was an English footballer who played as an inside forward for Oldham Athletic and Rochdale.

References

Rochdale A.F.C. players
Oldham Athletic A.F.C. players
Stalybridge Celtic F.C. players
Crewe Alexandra F.C. players
Macclesfield Town F.C. players
Eccles United F.C. players
Lancaster City F.C. players
English footballers
Footballers from Oldham
1896 births
1966 deaths
Association footballers not categorized by position